Murder at Monte Carlo is a British 1934 mystery crime thriller film directed by Ralph Ince and starring Errol Flynn, Eve Gray, Paul Graetz and Molly Lamont, the production was Flynn's debut film in a lead role in England.  The film is currently missing from the BFI National Archive, and is listed as one of the British Film Institute's "75 Most Wanted" lost films.<ref>{{cite web |url=http://old.bfi.org.uk/nationalarchive/news/mostwanted/murder-at-monte-carlo.html |title=Murder at Monte Carlo / BFI Most Wanted |publisher=British Film Institute |access-date=5 June 2014 |archive-url=https://web.archive.org/web/20190427213617/http://old.bfi.org.uk/nationalarchive/news/mostwanted/murder-at-monte-carlo.html |archive-date=27 April 2019 |url-status=dead }}</ref>

Plot
A Fleet Street reporter (Errol Flynn) investigates the claim of Dr Becker, a professor of mathematics, to possess an infallible system of beating the roulette wheel at Monte Carlo. He refuses to take his fiancee Gilian (Eve Gray) along, but she decides to go anyway and report on the story for a rival paper. Dr Becker winds up dead and it looks like suicide, but Gilian is convinced it is murder. The finale involves Gilian getting all the suspects into one room and re-enacting the crime.

Cast
 Errol Flynn as Dyter
 Eve Gray as Gilian
 Paul Graetz as Doctor Heinrich Becker
 Molly Lamont as Margaret Becker
 Ellis Irving as Marc Orton
 Laurence Hanray as Collum
 Henry Victor as Major
 Brian Buchel as Yates
 Peter Gawthorne as Duprez
 Gabriel Toyne as Wesley
 James Dale as Gustav
 Henry B. Longhurst as Editor
 Ernest Sefton as Sankey

Production
The film was a "quota quickie" made by Warner Brothers at their Teddington Studios in Middlesex, on the edge of London. Flynn had been discovered by Irving Asher, the Managing Director of the studios, who put him under a seven-year option contract after cabling his head office in Hollywood: "He is the best picture bet we have ever seen. He is twenty-five, Irish, looks like a cross between Charles Farrell and George Brent, same type and build, excellent actor, champion boxer & swimmer, guarantee he's a real find". Before this, Flynn had done some work as an extra at the Studios in the film I Adore You in 1933, and had then spent several months as an acting trainee with a repertory theatre company in Northampton, before returning to Teddington seeking a way to break into movie acting. The film was completed in November 1934 and Flynn left England for Hollywood soon afterwards.

Release
The film was never released theatrically in the US. But in February 1956, Jack Warner sold the rights to all of his pre-December 1949 films to Associated Artists Productions (which merged with United Artists Television in 1958, and later was subsequently acquired by Turner Broadcasting System in early 1986 as part of a failed takeover of MGM/UA by Ted Turner).

According to Filmink'' magazine:
It was pretty impressive of Flynn to have bagged another movie lead but it must be remembered this was the era of wet fish British leading men – Barry Barnes, Leslie Banks, etc – and Flynn would have stood out among the alternatives on offer; he had the smooth appearance and cultured voice so beloved by British producers of the time, but he also had an athletic, virile appearance… Also, it was a cheap movie – they weren’t taking that much of a risk giving him a chance.

See also
List of lost films

References

External links
BFI 75 Most Wanted entry

1934 films
1930s crime thriller films
British black-and-white films
British crime thriller films
1930s English-language films
Films about journalists
Films based on American novels
Lost British films
Quota quickies
Films about roulette
1930s mystery thriller films
British mystery thriller films
1934 lost films
Films directed by Ralph Ince
1930s British films